Sea ox-eye may refer to the following plant species:

Borrichia arborescens
Melanthera biflora